Baliguian, officially the Municipality of Baliguian (Subanen: Benwa Baliguian; Chavacano: Municipalidad de Baliguian), is a 3rd class municipality in the province of Zamboanga del Norte, Philippines. According to the 2020 census, it has a population of 23,771 people.

Geography

Barangays
Baliguian is politically subdivided into 17 barangays.

Climate

Demographics

Economy

References

External links
 Baliguian Profile at PhilAtlas.com
 [ Philippine Standard Geographic Code]
Philippine Census Information

Municipalities of Zamboanga del Norte